The Black Hussar is a 1915 German silent film directed by Harry Piel.

Cast
Fritz Schroeter
Carl Heinz Wolff

References

External links

Films of the German Empire
Films directed by Harry Piel
German silent feature films
German black-and-white films
Western Front (World War I) films
1910s German films
German World War I films